Raymond Gordon Hopper (born 3 March 1960) is a former Australian politician. He was a member of the Legislative Assembly of Queensland from 2001 to 2015. Originally elected as the member for Darling Downs as an independent in 2001, he joined the National Party later that year and the Liberal National Party in 2008.

Political career
During his time in Parliament, Hopper held a range of roles in opposition, namely the Shadow Minister for Racing, the Shadow Minister for Natural Resources and Mines, the Shadow Minister for Employment and Training, the Shadow Minister for Natural Resources and Mines, the Shadow Minister for Natural Resources and Water, the Shadow Minister for Food Security and Agriculture, and the Shadow Minister for Primary Industries, Fisheries and Rural and Regional Queensland.

On the abolition of his seat of Darling Downs in 2008, Hopper followed most of his constituents into the revived seat of Condamine. On 24 November 2012, Hopper resigned from the LNP and joined Katter's Australian Party. Hopper claimed that the LNP had been a takeover by the old Liberal Party at the expense of the National Party, even though most LNP MPs were former Nationals like him. He accused the LNP of deliberately purging National influence from the party. Hopper claimed to have spoken to eight other LNP backbenchers who were considering defection, but this did not eventuate.

On 29 November it was announced that he had become the party's leader in Queensland, taking over from Robbie Katter, the son of the party's founder, Bob Katter. He contested Nanango for the party in 2015, but was defeated.

Personal life
Hopper married his first wife Joanne in 1986. They had three children, Jodi, Amy and Ben. In 2010, Hopper split from his wife after a longstanding affair with his later-second wife, Jeanette Sutherland.

Ben Hopper was a candidate in the seat of Condamine at the 2015 state election in an effort to replace his father, who stood unsuccessfully in Nanango.

References

|-

|-

1960 births
Living people
Members of the Queensland Legislative Assembly
Independent members of the Parliament of Queensland
Katter's Australian Party politicians
National Party of Australia members of the Parliament of Queensland
Liberal National Party of Queensland politicians
People from Toowoomba
21st-century Australian politicians